The Sydney Theatre Awards are annual awards to recognise the strength, quality and diversity of professional theatre in Sydney, Australia. They were established in 2005 by a group of major Sydney theatre critics. The awards recognise mainstage and independent plays and musicals.

Selected award recipients

2022 
The 2022 awards were announced on 23 January 2023.

Best Mainstage Production: The Jungle and the Sea (Belvoir)
Best Independent Production: Albion (Secret House, New Ghosts Theatre Company and Seymour Centre)
Best Direction of a Mainstage Production: Kip Williams (Strange Case of Dr Jekyll and Mr Hyde)
Best Direction of an Independent Production: Lucy Clements (Albion)
Best Performance in a Leading Role in a Mainstage Production: Heather Mitchell (RBG: Of Many, One)
Best Performance in a Leading Role in an Independent Production: Jane Phegan (The End of Winter)
Best Performance in a Supporting Role in a Mainstage Production: Peter Carroll (The Tempest)
Best Performance in a Supporting Role in an Independent Production: Merridy Eastman (Hand of God)
Best Stage Design of a Mainstage Production: Mel Page (A Raisin in the Sun)
Best Stage Design of an Independent Production: Grace Deacon and Kelsey Lee (Destroy, She Said)
Best Costume Design of a Mainstage Production: Romance Was Born and Anna Cordingley (Amadeus)
Best Costume Design of an Independent Production: Esther Zhong (Moon Rabbit Rising)
Best Lighting Design of a Mainstage Production: Nick Schlieper (Strange Case of Dr Jekyll and Mr Hyde)
Best Lighting Design of an Independent Production: Tyler Fitzpatrick (Moon Rabbit Rising)
Best Sound Design of a Mainstage Production: Michael Toisuta (Strange Case of Dr Jekyll and Mr Hyde)
Best Original Score of a Mainstage Production: Arjunan Puveendran (The Jungle and the Sea)
Best Sound Design and Composition of an Independent Production: Christine Pan (Moon Rabbit Rising)
Best New Australian Work: The Jungle and the Sea (S. Shakthidharan and Eamon Flack)
Best Newcomer: Masego Pitso (Chewing Gum Dreams)
Best Ensemble: The Jungle and the Sea (Belvoir)
Best Production of a Musical: Moulin Rouge! The Musical (Global Creatures)
Best Direction of a Musical: Cameron Mitchell (Nice Work If You Can Get It)
Best Performance in a Leading Role in a Musical: Stefanie Jones (Mary Poppins)
Best Performance in a Supporting Role in a Musical: Simon Burke (Moulin Rouge! The Musical)
Best Musical Direction: Chris King, Steven Kramer and Nigel Ubrihien (Jekyll and Hyde)
Best Choreography in a Musical: Cameron Mitchell (Nice Work If You Can Get It)
Best Production for Children: Yong (Monkey Baa Theatre)
Best Production for Young People: The Deb (ATYP)
Lifetime Achievement Award: John Robertson and William Yang

2021 
The 2021 awards were announced on 31 January 2022.

Best Mainstage Production: The Picture of Dorian Gray (Sydney Theatre Company)
Best Independent Production: Symphonie Fantastique (Little Eggs Collective in association with KXT)
Best Direction of a Mainstage Production: Kip Williams (The Picture of Dorian Gray)
Best Direction of an Independent Production: Tasnim Hossain (Yellow Face)
Best Performance in a Leading Role in a Mainstage Production: Eryn Jean Norvill (The Picture of Dorian Gray)
Best Performance in a Leading Role in an Independent Production: Shan-Ree Tan (Yellow Face)
Best Performance in a Supporting Role in a Mainstage Production: Aaron Tsindos (No Pay? No Way!)
Best Performance in a Supporting Role in an Independent Production: Alfie Gledhill (The Removalists)
Best Stage Design of a Mainstage Production: Marg Horwell and David Bergman (The Picture of Dorian Gray)
Best Stage Design of an Independent Production: Charles Davis (Happy Days)
Best Costume Design of a Mainstage Production: Genevieve Blanchett (Home, I’m Darling)
Best Costume Design of an Independent Production: Esther Zhong (Three Fat Virgins Unassembled)
Best Lighting Design of a Mainstage Production: Matt Scott (Fun Home)
Best Lighting Design of an Independent Production: Benjamin Brockman (Symphonie Fantastique)
Best Sound Design of a Mainstage Production: David Bergman (Green Park)
Best Sound Design and Composition of an Independent Production: Oliver Shermacher (Symphonie Fantastique)
Best New Australian Work: The Visitors (Jane Harrison)
Best Newcomer: Kiana Daniele (SIX)
Best Ensemble: Symphonie Fantastique
Best Production of a Musical: Hamilton (Jeffrey Seller, Sander Jacobs, Jill Furman, The Public Theater and Michael Cassel)
Best Direction of a Musical: Dean Bryant (Fun Home)
Best Performance in a Leading Role in a Musical: Lyndon Watts (Hamilton)
Best Performance in a Supporting Role in a Musical: Marty Alix (Hamilton)
Best Musical Direction: Carmel Dean (Fun Home)
Best Cabaret Production: Is This All Then? (Philip Quast)
Best Production for Children: Wilfrid Gordon McDonald Partridge (Sydney Opera House and Australian Chamber Orchestra)
Best Production for Young People: I've Been Meaning to Ask You (The Good Room, Critical Stages Touring, ATYP and Riverside Theatres)
Lifetime Achievement Award:  Gale Edwards and Tony Sheldon

2019 
The 2019 awards were announced on 20 January 2020.

Best Mainstage Production: Counting and Cracking (Belvoir and Co-Curious)
Best Independent Production: John (Outhouse Theatre Co and Seymour Centre)
Best Direction of a Mainstage Production: Paige Rattray (The Beauty Queen of Leenane)
Best Direction of an Independent Production: Dino Dimitriadis (Angels in America)
Best Female Actor in a Leading Role in a Mainstage Production: Sheridan Harbridge (Prima Facie)
Best Male Actor in a Leading Role in a Mainstage Production: Meyne Wyatt (City of Gold)
Best Female Actor in a Leading Role in an Independent Production: Janine Watson (The Happy Prince)
Best Male Actor in a Leading Role in an Independent Production: Justin Amankwah (Good Dog)
Best Female Actor in a Supporting Role in a Mainstage Production: Shari Sebbens (City of Gold)
Best Male Actor in a Supporting Role in a Mainstage Production: Hamish Michael (The Beauty Queen of Leenane)
Best Female Actor in a Supporting Role in an Independent Production: Catherine Văn-Davies (Angels in America)
Best Male Actor in a Supporting Role in an Independent Production: Joseph Althouse (Angels in America)
Best Sound Design and Composition of an Independent Production: 
Best Independent Musical: American Psycho (BB Arts Entertainment and Two Doors Productions)
Best New Australian Work: Counting and Cracking (S. Shakthidharan)
Best Production of a Mainstage Musical: Fangirls (Belvoir, Queensland Theatre and Brisbane Festival in association with ATYP)
Lifetime Achievement Award:  Maggie Blinco

2018 
The 2018 awards were announced on 21 January 2019.
 Best Mainstage Production: The Harp in the South (Sydney Theatre Company)
 Best Direction of a Mainstage Production: Kip Williams (The Harp in the South)
 Best Female Actor in a Leading Role in a Mainstage Production: Claire Lovering (The Feather in the Web)
 Best Male Actor in a Leading Role in a Mainstage Production: Hugo Weaving (The Resistible Rise of Arturo Ui)
 Best Independent Production: Stupid Fucking Bird (New Theatre)
 Best New Australian Work: The Harp in the South (Kate Mulvany)
 Best Production of a Musical: Cry-Baby (LPD in association with Hayes Theatre Co)
 Best Cabaret Production: Since Ali Died (Omar Musa)
 Lifetime Achievement Award: Robert Love, director, Riverside Theatres Parramatta

2017 
The 2017 awards were announced on 22 January 2018.
 Best Mainstage Production: Hir (Belvoir)
 Best Direction of a Mainstage Production: Anthea Williams (Hir)
 Best Female Actor in a Leading Role in a Mainstage Production: Kate Mulvany (Richard 3)
 Best Male Actor in a Leading Role in a Mainstage Production: Mitchell Butel (The Merchant of Venice)
 Best Independent Production: A View From the Bridge (Red Line Productions)
 Best New Australian Work: Shit (Patricia Cornelius)
 Best Production of a Mainstream Musical: Muriel’s Wedding The Musical (Sydney Theatre Company and Global Creatures)
 Best Production of an Independent Musical: Calamity Jane (One Eyed Man Productions in association with Neglected Musicals and Hayes Theatre Co)
 Lifetime Achievement Award: Brian Thomson

2016 
The 2016 awards were announced at the Seymour Centre on 23 January 2017. Recipients included:
 Best Mainstage Production: The Drover’s Wife (Belvoir)
 Best Direction of a Mainstage Production: Leticia Caceres (The Drover’s Wife)
 Best Female Actor in a Leading Role in a Mainstage Production: Marta Dusseldorp (Gloria)
 Best Male Actor in a Leading Role in a Mainstage Production: Colin Friels (Faith Healer)
 Best Independent Production: Antigone (Sport for Jove)
 Best New Australian Work: Leah Purcell (The Drover’s Wife)
 Best Production of a Musical: Little Shop of Horrors (Luckiest Productions and Tinderbox Productions in association with Hayes Theatre Co)
 Lifetime Achievement Award: Judi Farr

2015 
The 2015 awards were announced at the Paddington RSL on 18 January 2016. Recipients included:
 Best Mainstage Production: Ivanov (Belvoir)
 Best Direction of a Mainstage Production: Eamon Flack (Ivanov)
 Best Actress in a Leading Role in a Mainstage Production: Eryn Jean Norvill (Suddenly Last Summer)
 Best Actor in a Leading Role in a Mainstage Production: Hugo Weaving (Endgame)
 Best Independent Production: Of Mice and Men (Sport for Jove and Seymour Centre)
 Best New Australian Work: The Bleeding Tree (Angus Cerini)
 Best Production of a Musical: Matilda (The Royal Shakespeare Company, Louise Withers, Michael Coppel and Michael Watt)
 Lifetime Achievement Award: Christine Dunstan

2014 
 Best Mainstage Production: Henry V (Bell Shakespeare)
 Best Direction of a Mainstage Production: Damien Ryan (Henry V)
 Best Actress in a Leading Role in a Mainstage Production: Sarah Peirse (Switzerland)
 Best Actor in a Leading Role in a Mainstage Production: Richard Roxburgh (Cyrano de Bergerac)
 Best Independent Production: All's Well That Ends Well (Sport for Jove)
 Best New Australian Work: Switzerland (Joanna Murray-Smith)
 Best Production of a Musical: Sweet Charity (Luckiest Productions and Gooding Productions in association with Hayes Theatre Co)
 Lifetime Achievement Award: Reg Livermore

2013 
 Best Mainstage Production: Waiting for Godot (Sydney Theatre Company)
 Best Direction of a Mainstage Production: Sam Strong (The Floating World) 
 Best Actress in a Leading Role in a Mainstage Production: Harriet Dyer (Machinal)
 Best Actor in a Leading Role in a Mainstage Production: Peter Kowitz (The Floating World)
 Best Independent Production: Cyrano de Bergerac (Sport for Jove) 
 Best New Australian Work: Andrew Bovell (The Secret River)
 Best Production of a Musical: Dirty Rotten Scoundrels
 Lifetime Achievement Award: John Romeril

2012 
 Best Mainstage Production: Medea (Belvoir in association with Australian Theatre for Young People)
 Best Direction of a Mainstage Production: Anne-Louise Sarks (Medea)
 Best Actress in a Leading Role in a Mainstage Production: Blazey Best (Medea)
 Best Actor in a Leading Role in a Mainstage Production: Josh McConville (The Boys)
 Best Independent Production: Punk Rock (pantsguys Productions with atyp Under The Wharf)
 Best New Australian Work: Medea (Kate Mulvany and Anne-Louise Sarks after Euripides)
 Best Production of a Musical: South Pacific
 Lifetime Achievement Award: Barry Humphries

2011
The 2011 Sydney Theatre Awards were announced in Paddington, NSW on 15 January 2012.
 Best Mainstage Production: The Wild Duck (Belvoir) 
 Best Direction of a Mainstage Production: Simon Stone (The Wild Duck) 
 Best Actress in a Leading Role in a Mainstage Production: Cate Blanchett (Gross und Klein) 
 Best Actor in a Leading Role in a Mainstage Production: Colin Moody (Julius Caesar) 
 Best Independent Production: The Libertine (Sport for Jove Theatre with Darlinghurst Theatre Company) 
 Best New Australian Work: The Dark Room (Angela Betzien) 
 Best Production of a Musical: Hairspray
 Lifetime Achievement Award: David Williamson

References

External links
 Official website

Australian theatre awards
Awards established in 2005
Theatre in Sydney